Miss America's Outstanding Teen pageants select the representative for each state for the Miss America's Outstanding Teen pageant.

Although Miss America state pageants used to run unofficial teen competitions, Miss America's Outstanding Teen was the first official teen pageant associated with the Miss America Organization and the first for which there was a national competition. The first national pageant was held in August 2005 at the Orange County Convention Center in Orlando, Florida.

As this is the teen version of the Miss America pageant, there has never been a swimwear component of the competition: contestants compete in interview, evening wear, active wear, and talent.

Alabama
See Miss Alabama's Outstanding Teen

Alaska
See Miss Alaska's Outstanding Teen

Arizona
See Miss Arizona's Outstanding Teen

Arkansas
See Miss Arkansas' Outstanding Teen

California
See Miss California's Outstanding Teen

Colorado
See Miss Colorado's Outstanding Teen

Connecticut
See Miss Connecticut's Outstanding Teen

Delaware
See Miss Delaware's Outstanding Teen

District of Columbia
See Miss District of Columbia's Outstanding Teen

Florida
See Miss Florida's Outstanding Teen

Georgia
See Miss Georgia's Outstanding Teen

Hawaii
See Miss Hawaii's Outstanding Teen

Idaho
See Miss Idaho's Outstanding Teen

Illinois
See Miss Illinois' Outstanding Teen

Indiana
See Miss Indiana's Outstanding Teen

Iowa
See Miss Iowa's Outstanding Teen

Kansas
See Miss Kansas' Outstanding Teen

Kentucky
See Miss Kentucky's Outstanding Teen

Louisiana
See Miss Louisiana's Outstanding Teen

Maine
See Miss Maine's Outstanding Teen

Maryland
See Miss Maryland's Outstanding Teen

Massachusetts
See Miss Massachusetts' Outstanding Teen

Michigan
See Miss Michigan's Outstanding Teen

Minnesota
See Miss Minnesota's Outstanding Teen

Mississippi
See Miss Mississippi's Outstanding Teen

Missouri
See Miss Missouri's Outstanding Teen

Montana
See Miss Montana's Outstanding Teen

Nebraska
See Miss Nebraska's Outstanding Teen

Nevada
See Miss Nevada's Outstanding Teen

New Hampshire
See Miss New Hampshire's Outstanding Teen

New Jersey
See Miss New Jersey's Outstanding Teen

New Mexico
See Miss New Mexico's Outstanding Teen

New York
See Miss New York's Outstanding Teen

North Carolina
See Miss North Carolina's Outstanding Teen

North Dakota
See Miss North Dakota's Outstanding Teen

Ohio
See Miss Ohio's Outstanding Teen

Oklahoma
See Miss Oklahoma's Outstanding Teen

Oregon
See Miss Oregon's Outstanding Teen

Pennsylvania
See Miss Pennsylvania's Outstanding Teen

Puerto Rico

See Miss Puerto Rico's Outstanding Teen

Rhode Island
See Miss Rhode Island's Outstanding Teen

South Carolina
See Miss South Carolina Teen

South Dakota
See Miss South Dakota's Outstanding Teen

Tennessee
See Miss Tennessee's Outstanding Teen

Texas
See Miss Texas' Outstanding Teen

Utah
See Miss Utah's Outstanding Teen

Vermont
See Miss Vermont's Outstanding Teen

Virginia
See Miss Virginia's Outstanding Teen

Virgin Islands
See Miss Virgin Islands' Outstanding Teen

Washington
See Miss Washington's Outstanding Teen

West Virginia
See Miss West Virginia's Outstanding Teen

Wisconsin
See Miss Wisconsin's Outstanding Teen

Wyoming
See Miss Wyoming's Outstanding Teen

General references

References

Outstanding Teen state pageants